Megarian Treasury may refer to the following ancient Greek buildings:

Megarian Treasury (Olympia)
Megarian Treasury (Delphi)